Border Blackbirds is a 1927  American silent Western film directed by Leo D. Maloney and starring Maloney, Eugenia Gilbert and Nelson McDowell.

Cast
 Leo D. Maloney as Bart Evans 
 Eugenia Gilbert as Marion Kingsley
 Nelson McDowell as Mournful Luke
 Joe Rickson as Suderman
 Bud Osborne as McWraight
 Frank Clark
 Morgan Davis
 Tom London
 Don Coleman
 Allen Watt

References

External links
 

1927 films
1927 Western (genre) films
American black-and-white films
Films directed by Leo D. Maloney
Pathé Exchange films
Silent American Western (genre) films
1920s English-language films
1920s American films